The Vice Chairman of the Central Committee of the Chinese Communist Party was the second-highest rank after the Chairman within the Chinese Communist Party (CCP) from 1956 to 1982. The position was phased out after 1982 in order to remove the "Chairman" position from any government posting, resigning it solely to the late Mao Zedong.

All vice chairmen were members of the Politburo Standing Committee of the Chinese Communist Party.

List of Vice Chairmen

Chinese Communist Party
Political history of China
Politburo of the Chinese Communist Party
Collective heads of government